The 1906 German football championship was the fourth competition for the national championship of Germany. Held under the auspices of the German Football Association (DFB), eight teams competed for the title. For the first time only champions of regional football associations were admitted to the championship, excluding champions of local associations such as the Verband Magdeburger Ballspielvereine (Association of Magdeburg ballgame clubs). An exception was the situation in Berlin where two associations — the Verband Berliner Ballspielvereine (VBB) and the Märkischer Fußballbund (MFB) — existed. Both their champions were admitted, as were defending champions Berliner TuFC Union 92. This led to three teams from Berlin competing in the final tournament.

Qualified teams
The qualified teams:

Competition

Quarter-finals

Semi-finals

Final

References

German football championship seasons
1
German